Chinese era names were titles used by various Chinese dynasties and regimes in Imperial China for the purpose of year identification and numbering. The first monarch to adopt era names was the Emperor Wu of Han in 140 BCE, and this system remained the official method of year identification and numbering until the establishment of the Republic of China in 1912 CE, when the era name system was superseded by the Republic of China calendar. Other polities in the Sinosphere—Korea, Vietnam and Japan—also adopted the concept of era name as a result of Chinese politico-cultural influence.

Description
Chinese era names were titles adopted for the purpose of identifying and numbering years in Imperial China. Era names originated as mottos or slogans chosen by the reigning monarch and usually reflected the political, economic and/or social landscapes at the time. For instance, the first era name proclaimed by the Emperor Wu of Han, Jianyuan (lit. "establishing the origin"), was reflective of its status as the first era name. Similarly, the era name Jianzhongjingguo (lit. "establishing a moderate and peaceful country") used by the Emperor Huizong of Song was indicative of Huizong's idealism towards moderating the rivalry among the conservative and progressive parties regarding political and social reforms.

The process of declaring an era name was referred to in traditional Chinese historical texts as jiànyuán. Declaring an era name to replace an existing era name was known as gǎiyuán (lit. "change the origin"). Instituting a new era name would reset the numbering of the year back to year one or yuán. On the first day of the Chinese calendar, the numbering of the year would increase by one. To name a year using an era name only requires counting years from the first year of the era. For example, 609 CE was the fifth year of Daye (lit. "great endeavour"), as the era began in 605 CE; traditional Chinese sources would therefore refer to 609 CE as Dàyè wǔ nián.

The numbering of the year would still increase on the first day of the Chinese calendar each year, regardless of the month in which the era name was adopted. For example, as the Emperor Daizong of Tang replaced the era name Yongtai (lit. "perpetual peace") with Dali (lit. "great era") in the eleventh month of the Chinese calendar in 766 CE, the first year of Dali thus only consisted of the last two months of that particular year; the second year of Dali began on the first day of the Chinese calendar the following year, just two months after its initiation.

When a new monarch ascended to the throne, he could either declare a new era immediately or inherit the usage of the existing era name from his predecessor. For example, the era name Wutai (lit. "exalted martial") of the Emperor Xiaoming of Northern Wei was immediately replaced with Jianyi (lit. "establishing justice") when the Emperor Xiaozhuang of Northern Wei took the throne. On the other hand, the era name Tianxian (lit. "heavenly intent") was originally proclaimed by the Emperor Taizu of Liao but its usage was continued by the Emperor Taizong of Liao upon assuming the throne.

There were numerous era names that saw repeated use throughout Chinese history. For instance, the era name Taiping (lit. "great peace") was used on at least seven occasions. In such cases, Chinese sources would often affix the name of the dynasty or the ruler before the era name.

Most Chinese era names consisted of two Chinese characters, even though era names with three, four and six characters also existed. Shijianguo (lit. "the beginning of establishing a country") of the Xin dynasty, Tiancewansui (lit. "Heaven-conferred longevity") of the Wu Zhou, and Tiancilishengguoqing (lit. "Heaven-bestowed ritualistic richness, nationally celebrated") of the Western Xia are examples of Chinese era names that bore more than two characters.

Era names were symbols of political orthodoxy and legitimacy. Hence, most Chinese monarchs would proclaim a new era upon the founding of a new dynasty. Rebel leaders who sought to establish independence and legitimacy also declared their own era names. Often, vassal states and tributary states of Imperial China would officially adopt the era name of the reigning Chinese monarch as a sign of subordination—a practice known as fèng zhēng shuò (lit. "following the first month of the year and the first day of the month"). For example, Korean regimes like Silla, Goryeo and Joseon had at various times formally adopted the era names of the Tang, Wu Zhou, Later Liang, Later Tang, Later Jin, Later Han, Later Zhou, Northern Song, Liao, Jin, Yuan, Northern Yuan, Ming, and Qing dynasties of China for both domestic and diplomatic purposes.

History
The Emperor Wu of Han is conventionally regarded as the first ruler to declare an era name. Prior to the introduction of the first era name in 140 BCE, Chinese monarchs utilized the Qianyuan, Zhongyuan and Houyuan systems to identify and number years.

Prior to the Ming dynasty, it was common for Chinese sovereigns to change the era name during their reigns, resulting in the use of more than one era name for one ruler. For instance, Emperor Xuan of Han used a total of seven era names during his reign.

The Hongwu Emperor started the tradition of having only one era name for one monarch—known as the yī shì yī yuán zhì (lit. "one-era-name-for-a-lifetime system"). Thus, modern historians would frequently refer to monarchs of the Ming and Qing dynasties by their respective era name. Notable exceptions to this "one-era-name" tradition included Zhu Qizhen who proclaimed two era names for his two separate reigns, Aisin Gioro Hong Taiji who used two era names to reflect his position as khan of the Later Jin and later as emperor of the Qing dynasty, as well as Aisin Gioro Puyi who adopted three era names in his capacity as emperor of the Qing dynasty and subsequently as ruler of Manchukuo.

With the establishment of the Republic of China in 1912 CE, the Chinese era name system was superseded by the Republic of China calendar which remains in official use in Taiwan, Penghu, Kinmen, and Matsu Islands. The Republic of China calendar, while not an era name, is based on the era name system of Imperial China. Numerous attempts to reinstate monarchical rule in China had resulted in the declaration of additional era names after the founding of the Republic, but these regimes and their associated era names were short-lived.

The concept of era name also saw its adoption by neighboring Korea and Vietnam since the middle of the 6th century CE, and by Japan since the middle of the 7th century CE. Notably, Japan still officially retains the use of era names today.

Era system versus Western dating system

While the era system is a more traditional system of dating that preserves Chinese and Japanese culture, it presents a problem for the more globalized Asian society and for everyday life.

For example, even though within the nation people will know what era they are in, it is relatively meaningless for other nations. In addition, while the Republic of China (ROC) and Japan only recognize documents dated in the Era System, their treaties with other countries are in the Dionysian Era (AD) system. In modern times, only Republic of China and Japan still continue to use the ancient Chinese era naming system.

Even in the domestic arena, the era system can present difficult dilemmas. For example, in Japan, it is difficult to keep track of the age of people who were born in the previous era. Also, while the ROC and Japan both continue to use the ancient Chinese era system, since they have partially adopted the Gregorian calendar for non-governmental use, it is more difficult to track down dates that fall on February 29 leap year in the Western calendar.

Furthermore, in Japan, in theory it is difficult to mention future dates since it is sometimes hard to tell whether the current emperor will live long enough for its citizens to use that era name. However, in practice, documents like driver's licenses and 50-year leases use era dates without regard to this problem.

On the other hand, others suggest that the AD system has too much Christian connotation behind it and it is a form of cultural imperialism when an essentially European system of dating is forced upon other civilizations with their own long-used and equally legitimate dating systems. However, with globalization, the AD system is becoming more acceptable in Japan and the ROC.

Modern history researchers do not care about era names except for supporting other arguments, such as figuring out the biases and attitudes of a particular historian; however, era names are useful for dating events that were unique in Chinese history. Most Chinese dictionaries have a comprehensive list of era names, while booklets of more detailed and often searchable lists can be found in libraries.

See also 

 Chinese calendar
 Chinese sovereign
 List of Chinese era names
 Regnal year
 Republic of China calendar
 Derivative systems in Sinosphere:
 Japanese era name
 Korean era name
 Vietnamese era name
 Temple name
 Posthumous name
 Regnal name

References

External links 
 Comparative historical timelines and era names of China, Japan and Korea (in Japanese)

Calendar eras
Era name
Historical eras
Era name